Naval Auxiliary Air Station Vernalis was a United States Navy facility located in the small town of Vernalis, California during World War II. It opened on June 8, 1943, and closed on October 15, 1945.

History
It served as an auxiliary station to Naval Air Station Alameda. It also housed German prisoners of war during World War II. The site is located northeast of the intersection of Gaffery Road and Koster Road. The Navy used the 160 acre Vernalis Bombing Target, located roughly 4.4 miles southwest of the Air Station, as a dive bombing range. The air base also supported the nearby Hammond General Hospital. On the 4000-foot runway, Seabees installed a catapult and arresting gear for aircraft carrier training.  For strafing training, a range was made on the Diablo Range with a silhouette of a submarine painted on rocks.

The site came to life again in the 1950s; the US Air Force used it as the Vernalis Geophysics Annex, operated with the Cambridge Research Laboratory. It was used with other Annex bases in the Air Force's Project Moby Dick, to test high altitude wind patterns. From the Annex, stratospheric balloons were launched and tracked by a network of radio receiving stations across the US. The site was again abandoned in the 1960s. In the 1970s it became a drag strip. In the 1980s and later it was used for scrap metal, scrap wood processing, and fertilizer manufacturing businesses.

See also

California during World War II
American Theater (1939–1945)
Desert Training Center
United States home front during World War II

References

Installations of the United States Navy in California
San Joaquin County, California
Vernalis
Formerly Used Defense Sites in California
California in World War II
1943 establishments in California
1945 disestablishments in California

Closed installations of the United States Navy